The Black Forest Girl is a 1929 German silent romance film directed by Victor Janson and starring Liane Haid, Fred Louis Lerch and Walter Janssen.

It was distributed by the German branch of the American company First National Pictures. The film's art direction was by Heinz Fenchel and Jacek Rotmil. The film is based on the 1917 operetta of the same title, composed by Leon Jessel with a libretto by August Neidhart. It is set in the Black Forest region of Germany in the 1840s.

Plot

Cast

References

Bibliography

External links

1929 films
Films of the Weimar Republic
1920s historical romance films
German silent feature films
German historical romance films
Films directed by Victor Janson
Films set in the Black Forest
Films set in the 1840s
Films based on operettas
German black-and-white films
1920s German films
1920s German-language films
Silent historical romance films